Einar Hansen can refer to:

 Einar Hansen (Norwegian footballer)
 Einar Hanson
 Einar Tróndargjógv (Faroese footballer, earlier named Einar Hansen)